The 2016 Japanese Super Formula Championship  was the forty-fourth season of premier Japanese open-wheel motor racing, and the fourth under the name of Super Formula. Hiroaki Ishiura started his 2015 Championship defense when the season began on 24 April, and ended after seven rounds on 30 October.

The series changed tyre supplier from Bridgestone to Yokohama.

Teams and drivers
All teams were Japanese-registered and used the Dallara SF14 spec-racer chassis. Eight cars were powered by Honda's HR-414E engine, with the other 11 cars using Toyota's RI4A engine.

Race calendar and results
A provisional calendar for the 2016 season was released on 10 December 2015. The 7 rounds of the 2016 Super-Formula Championship were held over 7 months from April through October, with a 7 week long summer hiatus through June to mid-July. All events were held on premier, natural terrain road racing circuits in Japan. Thus far, no events on the Super Formula calendar have been held on super-speedway ovals or on city street circuits.

The Autopolis round was cancelled on May 29 due to damage caused by the Kumamoto earthquake. However, on July 15, it was decided that Okayama would take its place at the same date, holding a double-header round.

Championship standings

Drivers' Championship
Scoring system

Driver standings

Teams' Championship

 Half points were awarded at the first Okayama round as less than 75% of the scheduled distance was completed.

References

External links
Japanese Championship Super Formula official website 

2016
Super Formula
Super Formula